is a Japanese term, a stronger form of .

Ōsensei may also refer to:
 Morihei Ueshiba (1883–1969), founder of Aikido
 Masutatsu Oyama (1923–1994), founder of Kyokushinkai karate
 O-Sensei,  a fictional character in the DC Universe